The Florida Building Code (FBC) is a set of standards designed by the US state of Florida for buildings. Many regulations and guidelines distributed are important benchmarks regarding hurricane protection. Miami-Dade County was the first in Florida to certify hurricane-resistant standards for structures which the Florida Building Code subsequently enacted across all requirements for hurricane-resistant buildings. Many other states reference the requirements set in the Florida Building codes, or have developed their own requirements for hurricanes.

The Florida Building Code is also based upon the International Building Code (IBC) used in the United States.

Hurricane guidelines 
The 2010 edition of the Florida Building Code introduced significant changes to wind load design, in particular the presentation of the wind speed maps.

The Miami-Dade and Broward County norms, are both included in the High-Velocity Hurricane Zones (HVHZ) and contain more stringent requirements. Other counties such as Palm Beach County do not require the same HVHZ building standards for compliance with the Florida Building Codes.

Both Miami-Dade County and the State of Florida maintain web-searchable databases of products approved for use as hurricane protection. These typically include not only actual test results from certified independent testing laboratories, they also contain "Product Approval Drawings" or "Installation Instructions" which provide specifications for hurricane shutter assembly and installation.

Impact tests conducted on building materials are measured and tested via TAS201, 202 and 203.

References

See also 
 International Building Code (IBC)

Tropical cyclone preparedness
Building codes
Standards of the United States